Milovan Zoričić (10 August 1850 – 30 December 1912) was a Croatian jurist and statistician.

Zoričić studied law in Zagreb and Graz. He was the first director of the Royal Statistical Bureau in Zagreb, established in 1875, which was the precursor of the modern-day Croatian Bureau of Statistics. He was also instrumental in starting the Croatian Statistical Yearbook, a major publication of the Bureau.

Zoričić was a full member of the Yugoslav Academy of Sciences and Arts since 1893.

Sources
 
 

1850 births
1912 deaths
Croatian statisticians
Scientists from Zagreb
Members of the Croatian Academy of Sciences and Arts